The New Bush is the eighth studio album released by Australian Country Musician Lee Kernaghan. It was released in April 2006 and peaked at number 6 on the ARIA Charts.

The album was nominated for the ARIA Award for Best Country Album at the ARIA Music Awards of 2006. At the 2007 Country Music Awards of Australia, the album won Album of the Year and Top Selling Album of the Year.

Track listing
 "Where I Come from"
 "Listen To The Radio"
 "The New Bush"
 "Diamantina Dream" (featuring Trisha Yearwood)
 "Love Shack"
 "Western World"
 "I'll Remember You"
 "Livin' in Australia"
 "Little Men"
 "Like Angels"
 "On the Beach"
 "When the Country Comes"
 "Close As a Whisper (The Gift)"

Charts

Weekly charts

Year-end charts

Certifications

References

2006 albums
Lee Kernaghan albums